Edward S. Kampf (October 14, 1900 – March 8, 1971) was a United States district judge of the United States District Court for the Northern District of New York.

Education and career

Born in Albany, New York, Kampf received a Bachelor of Laws from Albany Law School in 1924. He was a law clerk for New York State Senator William T. Byrne from 1924 to 1925. He was a member of the Albany County Board of Supervisors from 1931 to 1935. He was a Judge of the Albany Police Court from 1935 to 1945.

Federal judicial service

Kampf was nominated by President Harry S. Truman on January 17, 1946, to a seat on the United States District Court for the Northern District of New York vacated by Judge Frederick Howard Bryant. He was confirmed by the United States Senate on February 5, 1946, and received his commission on February 8, 1946. His service was terminated on July 1, 1948, due to his resignation.

Post judicial service

Following his resignation from the federal bench, Kampf engaged in private practice of law in Albany from 1948 to 1961. He died on March 8, 1971, in Miami, Florida.

References

Sources
 

1900 births
Albany Law School alumni
Judges of the United States District Court for the Northern District of New York
United States district court judges appointed by Harry S. Truman
20th-century American judges
1971 deaths
20th-century American lawyers